Rolf Heiner Schirmer (1 February 1942 – 20 September 2016) was a German physician and biochemist. From 1980 to 2007 he was a professor of biochemistry in the medical faculty of Ruprecht-Karls University in Heidelberg, Germany, and became a professor emeritus.

Education
Schirmer was born in Bremen. He studied medicine and philosophy in Heidelberg and Basel from 1961 to 1966, receiving his doctorate at the Max Planck Institute for Medical Research under the tutelage of Swiss physiologist Johann Caspar Rüegg. The topic of his dissertation was "The Distinctive Features of Contractile Proteins in Arteries" (German: Die Besonderheiten der contractilen Proteine der Arterien). He received his university professor qualification (German Habilitation) in 1975 in  biochemistry at the University of Heidelberg.

Academic career 
In 1964 he worked on the ion pumps of excitable membranes in Plymouth, England. From 1967 to 1970 he completed his medical residency, mainly in internal medicine. For this he was primarily at the Ludolf Krehl Clinic in  Heidelberg  but also at Dartmouth Medical School in New Hampshire]  as a postdoctoral fellow. From 1970 to 1980 he was an  assistant professor  at the Max Planck Institute for Medical Research, where he, together with Georg E. Schulz, conducted structure-based research on nucleotide-binding enzymes.

In 1980, the University of Heidelberg appointed  Schirmer to a professorship in biochemistry in their medical school. His fields of research covered the biochemistry of parasitic cells in malaria and in Chagas disease-induced cardiomyopathy as well as the enzyme structures of redox metabolism as attack points in chemotherapy to treat parasitic diseases. From 1987 onward, he worked at the Dana–Farber Cancer Institute   and at the University of Michigan during his research sabbaticals. From 1992 to 1993 he served as dean for the Faculty of Scientific Medicine.

Awards
In 2002  Schirmer received the "Dream Action Award" of the Dutch-based chemical corporation DSM for developing and clinically testing drug combinations containing methylene blue to combat malaria in West African children. Since then he has also contributed to the Centre de Recherche en Santé de Nouna (CRSN), Burkina Faso, as one of the founding members.

Publications

Books 
Schulz, G. E., and R. Heiner Schirmer. Principles of Protein Structure. New York: Springer-Verlag, 1979. Also translated into Japanese (	
タンパク質 : 構造・機能・進化 / Tanpakushits) and Russian,  According to WorldCat, the book is held in 749 libraries

Most highly cited journal articles 

 According to Google Scholar, this paper has been cited 406 times.

 According to Google Scholar, the paper has been cited 222 times. 
  
 According to Google Scholar, it has been cited 336 times.

See also 
 Curriculum vitae of R. Heiner Schirmer in the Biochemistry Center of the |University of Heidelberg 
 R. Heiner Schirmer's research group

References

1942 births
2016 deaths
German biochemists